is a passenger railway station located in the city of Kodaira, Tokyo, Japan.  It is named after the Ōme Kaidō highway which passes nearby the train station.

Lines
It is located 3.4 kilometers from the terminus of the line at Kokubunji Station.

Station layout
The station has a single side platform on a north-south axis, serving one ground-level bi-directional track. The station has one entrance/exit at the south of the station.  In addition to automatic ticket vending machines, a ticket window is located adjacent to the automatic wicket gates, which is staffed at all times during station opening hours. The first train to Kokubunji departs at 05:14 and the last train departs at 00:27 bound for Hagiyama.

History

Station numbering was introduced on all Seibu Railway lines during fiscal 2012, with Ōmekaidō Station becoming "ST03".

Passenger statistics
In fiscal 2019, the station was the 71st busiest on the Seibu network with an average of 8,367 passengers daily.

The passenger figures for previous years are as shown below.

Surrounding area
This connection is sometimes recommended by JR reservations service and online route planners.

See also
List of railway stations in Japan

References

External links

 Seibu Railway page for Ōmekaidō Station

Railway stations in Tokyo
Railway stations in Japan opened in 1928
Stations of Seibu Railway
Seibu Tamako Line
Kodaira, Tokyo